Margherita Boniver (born 11 March 1938) is an Italian politician.

Biography
Until 1962 she lived abroad, in places such as Washington, D.C., Bucharest and London. In Italy she founded the Italian section of Amnesty International which she led from 1973 to 1980.

She was a member of the Italian Chamber of Deputies for the Italian Socialist Party (PSI) from 1987 to 1992, and then of the Italian Senate from 1992 to 1994. She also served as Member of the European Parliament from 1987 to 1989. Between 1991 and 1993 she served twice as minister: Minister for Italians Abroad in the Andreotti VII Cabinet and Minister of Tourism in the Amato I Cabinet.

After the disbanding of PSI, Boniver joined Silvio Berlusconi's Forza Italia along with many other Socialists. After having unsuccessfully run again for the Italian Senate in 2001, she was appointed and served until 2006 as Undersecretary of Foreign Affairs in Berlusconi's II and III cabinets.

In 2006 and 2008 she was re-elected to the Chamber of Deputies, representing the social-democratic wing of the party.

References

1938 births
Living people
Politicians from Rome
Italian Socialist Party politicians
Socialist Party (Italy, 1996) politicians
Forza Italia politicians
The People of Freedom politicians
Forza Italia (2013) politicians
Government ministers of Italy
Senators of Legislature VIII of Italy
Senators of Legislature IX of Italy
Deputies of Legislature X of Italy
Deputies of Legislature XV of Italy
Deputies of Legislature XVI of Italy
Italian Socialist Party MEPs
MEPs for Italy 1984–1989
20th-century women MEPs for Italy
Women government ministers of Italy
21st-century Italian women politicians
Women members of the Chamber of Deputies (Italy)
Women members of the Senate of the Republic (Italy)